Geranium loxense is a species of plant in the family Geraniaceae. It is endemic to Ecuador.  Its natural habitats are subtropical or tropical high-altitude shrubland and subtropical or tropical high-altitude grassland.

References

loxense
Endemic flora of Ecuador
Vulnerable plants
Taxonomy articles created by Polbot